The 2018 Critérium du Dauphiné was a road cycling stage race that took place between 3 and 10 June 2018 in France. It was the 70th edition of the Critérium du Dauphiné and the twenty-third event of the 2018 UCI World Tour.

The race was won by a British rider from Team Sky, as Geraint Thomas won his first Dauphiné GC.

Teams
As the Critérium du Dauphiné was a UCI World Tour event, all eighteen UCI WorldTeams were invited automatically and obliged to enter a team in the race. Four UCI Professional Continental teams competed, completing the 22-team peloton.

Route

Stages

Prologue
3 June 2018 — Valence,

Stage 1
4 June 2018 — Valence to Saint-Just-Saint-Rambert,

Stage 2
5 June 2018 — Montbrison to Belleville,

Stage 3
6 June 2018 — Pont-de-Vaux to Louhans-Châteaurenaud,  (TTT)

Stage 4
7 June 2018 — Chazey-sur-Ain to Lans-en-Vercors,

Stage 5
8 June 2018 — Grenoble to Valmorel,

Stage 6
9 June 2018 — Frontenex to La Rosière,

Stage 7
10 June 2018 — Moûtiers to Saint-Gervais,

Classification leadership table
In the Critérium du Dauphiné, four different jerseys were awarded. The most important was the general classification, which was calculated by adding each cyclist's finishing times on each stage. Time bonuses were awarded to the first three finishers on all stages except for the individual time trial: the stage winner won a ten-second bonus, with six and four seconds for the second and third riders respectively. The rider with the least accumulated time is the race leader, identified by a yellow jersey with a blue bar; the winner of this classification was considered the winner of the race.

Additionally, there was a points classification, which awarded a green jersey. In the classification, cyclists received points for finishing in the top 10 in a stage. More points were awarded on the flatter stages in the opening half of the race.

There was also a mountains classification, the leadership of which was marked by a blue jersey with white polka dots. In the mountains classification, points towards the classification were won by reaching the top of a climb before other cyclists. Each climb was categorised as either hors, first, second, third, or fourth-category, with more points available for the higher-categorised climbs. Hors-category climbs awarded the most points; the first ten riders were able to accrue points, compared with the first six on first-category climbs, the first four on second-category, the first two on third-category and only the first for fourth-category.

The fourth jersey represented the young rider classification, marked by a white jersey. This was decided the same way as the general classification, but only riders born on or after 1 January 1993 were eligible to be ranked in the classification. There was also a team classification, in which the times of the best three cyclists per team on each stage were added together; the leading team at the end of the race was the team with the lowest total time.

References

External links

2018 UCI World Tour
2018 in French sport
2018
June 2018 sports events in France